Charles Ellis may refer to:

 Charles Alton Ellis (1876–1949), senior engineer for the design of the Golden Gate Bridge
 Charles Ellis (soccer) (1890–1954), American soccer midfielder
 Charles Ellis, 1st Baron Seaford (1771–1845), British politician
 Charles Ellis, 6th Baron Howard de Walden (1799–1868), his son, British peer and politician
 Charles Drummond Ellis (1895–1980), British physicist and scientific administrator
 Dick Ellis (Charles Howard Ellis, 1895–1975), Australian soldier and intelligence officer
 Charlie Ellis (1875–?), Australian rugby union player
 Charles H. Ellis III (born 1958), American preacher
 Charles D. Ellis (born 1937), American investment consultant
 Charles Ellis (cricketer, born 1830) (1830–1880), English cricketer
 Charles Ellis (cricketer, born 1815), English cricketer
 Charles Ellis Johnson (1857–1926), American photographer
 Charley Ellis (born 1944), American boxer